Iinoyama Dam  is an earthfill dam located in Hiroshima Prefecture in Japan. The dam is used for power production. The catchment area of the dam is 2.9 km2. The dam impounds about 36  ha of land when full and can store 1790 thousand cubic meters of water. The construction of the dam was completed in 1932.

References

Dams in Hiroshima Prefecture